North-West Football Championship is the north-west regional competition of Russian Amateur Football League, the fourth overall tier of the Russian football league system.

Competing regions
Teams from the following regions can take part in the tournament:
 Saint Petersburg
 Republic of Karelia
 Komi Republic
 Arkhangelsk Oblast
 Murmansk Oblast
 Kaliningrad Oblast
 Leningrad Oblast
 Novgorod Oblast
 Pskov Oblast
 Vologda Oblast
 Nenets Autonomous Okrug

The winners

The winners of the Championship
 1996 — Metallurg (Pikalyovo)
 1997 — Khimik-Pogranichnik (Slantsy)
 1998 — Oasis (Yartsevo)
 1999 — Pskov (Pskov)
 2000 — Svetogorets (Svetogorsk)
 2001 — Kondopoga (Kondopoga)
 2002 — Pikalyovo (Pikalyovo)
 2003 — Baltika-Tarko (Kaliningrad)
 2004 — Lokomotiv (Saint Petersburg)
 2005 — Baltika-2 (Kaliningrad)
 2006 — Apatit (Kirovsk)
 2007 — Sever (Murmansk)
 2008 — Torpedo-Piter (Saint Petersburg)
 2009 — Apatit (Kirovsk)
 2010 — Khimik (Koryazhma)
 2011/2012 — Rus (Saint Petersburg)
 2012/2013 — Trevis and VVK (Saint Petersburg)
 2013 — Trevis and VVK (Saint Petersburg)
 2014 — Karelia (Petrozavodsk)
 2015 — Zvezda (Saint Petersburg)
 2016 — Zvezda (Saint Petersburg)
 2017 — Zvezda (Saint Petersburg)
 2018 — Khimik (Koryazhma)
 2019 — FC Market Sveta (Saint Petersburg)
 2020 — Dynamo (Saint Petersburg)
 2021 — Yadro (Saint Petersburg)

The winners of the Cup
 1997 — Khimik-Pogranichnik (Slantsy)
 1999 — Pskov (Pskov)
 2000 — Dynamo-Stroyimpuls (Saint Petersburg)
 2001 — Tarko (Kaliningrad)
 2002 — Tarko (Kaliningrad)
 2003 — Baltika-Tarko (Kaliningrad)
 2004 — Luki-SKIF (Velikiye Luki)
 2005 — Baltika-2 (Kaliningrad)
 2006 — Sever (Murmansk)
 2007 — Pskov-747 (Pskov)
 2008 — Apatit (Kirovsk)
 2009 — Baltika-M (Kaliningrad)
 2010 — Karelia-Discovery (Petrozavodsk)
 2011 — Apatit (Kirovsk)
 2012/2013 — Trevis and VVK (Saint Petersburg)
 2014 — Karelia (Petrozavodsk)
 2015 — Zvezda (Saint Petersburg)
 2016 — Zvezda (Saint Petersburg)
 2017 — Avtofavorit (Pskov)
 2018 — Zvezda (Saint Petersburg)
 2019 — Dynamo (Saint Petersburg)
 2020 — Pskov (Pskov)

References

External links
 https://web.archive.org/web/20100824220416/http://www.szfoot.ru/index.php?option=com_content&view=article&id=30&Itemid=119

Football leagues in Russia